Machhra is a village situated in Meerut district, Uttar Pradesh state of India.

References

Villages in Meerut district